Sanhe is a town of Bozhou District, Zunyi in northern Guizhou, People's Republic of China, located  south-southwest of the county seat. , it has 4 residential communities and 8 villages under its administration. The town is situated along China National Highway 210 and G75 Lanzhou–Haikou Expressway.

References

Towns in Guizhou
Zunyi